Digital usually refers to something using discrete digits, often binary digits.

Technology and computing

Hardware
Digital electronics, electronic circuits which operate using digital signals
Digital camera, which captures and stores digital images 
Digital versus film photography
Digital computer, a computer that handles information represented by discrete values
Digital recording, information recorded using a digital signal

Socioeconomic phenomena
Digital culture, the anthropological dimension of the digital social changes
Digital divide, a form of economic and social inequality in access to or use of information and communication technologies
Digital economy, an economy based on computing and telecommunications resources

Other uses in technology and computing
Digital data, discrete data, usually represented using binary numbers
Digital marketing, search engine & social media presence booster, usually represented using online visibility.
Digital media, media stored as digital data
Digital radio, which uses digital technology to transmit or receive
Digital television, television systems which broadcast using digital signals
Digital signal (electronics), signals formed from a discrete set of waveforms, rather than continuous ranges
Digital signal (signal processing), sampled analog signals represented as a sequence of digital values

Art, entertainment, and media
Digital: A Love Story (2010), an indie video game by Christine Love
Digital (album), an album by KRS-One
"Digital" (Goldie song) (1998)
"Digital" (Joy Division song) (1978)
"Digital (Did You Tell)", a song by Stone Sour (2010)
"Digital", a song by Soulja Boy from The DeAndre Way
"Digital", a song by T-Pain from Three Ringz
Digital painting, a method of creating visual art using computers

Brands and enterprises
Digital Equipment Corporation (DEC) or Digital, a computer company
Digital Research (DR or DRI), a software company

Other uses
Relating to the fingers
Digital exam, in proctology
Digital bank or Neobank
Digital Party, a political party in Uruguay
Vitalis Takawira or Digital, professional football player

See also
Digit (disambiguation)
Digital download (disambiguation)
Digital fingerprint (disambiguation)
Binary code
Boolean algebra
:Category:Digital media